Purple Springs is a hamlet in southern Alberta, Canada within the Municipal District of Taber.

History 
The Government of Alberta established the Purple Springs Grazing Reserve in 1957 that is located 0.8 km away from the community.

Demographics 

The Municipal District of Taber's 2016 municipal census counted a population of 44 in Purple Springs, a  change from the hamlet's 2013 municipal census population of 41.

See also 
List of communities in Alberta
List of hamlets in Alberta

References 

Designated places in Alberta
Hamlets in Alberta
Municipal District of Taber